Peremptory can refer to any of the following concepts in law:

 Peremptory challenge
 Peremptory norm
 Peremptory plea